The Afaka script ( afaka sikifi) is a syllabary of 56 letters devised in 1910 for the Ndyuka language, an English-based creole of Suriname. The script is named after its inventor, Afáka Atumisi. It continues to be used to write Ndyuka in the 21st century, but the literacy rate in the language for all scripts is under 10%.

Afaka is the only script in use that was designed specifically for a creole.

Typology

Afaka is a defective script. Tone is phonemic but not written. Final consonants (the nasal [n]) are not written, but long vowels are, by adding a vowel letter. Prenasalized stops and voiced stops are written with the same letters, and syllables with the vowels [u] and [o] are seldom distinguished: The syllables [o]/[u], [po]/[pu], and [to]/[tu] have separate letters, but syllables starting with the consonants [b, d, dy, f, g, l, m, n, s, y] do not. Thus the Afaka rendition of Ndyuka could also be read as Dyoka. In four cases syllables with [e] and [i] are not distinguished (after the consonants [l, m, s, w]); a single letter is used for both [ba] and [pa], and another for both [u] and [ku]. Several consonants have only one glyph assigned to them. These are [ty], which only has a glyph for [tya]; [kw] (also [kp]), which only has [kwa ~ kpa]; [ny], which only has [nya] (though older records report that letter pulled double duty for [nyu]); and [dy], which only has [dyu/dyo]. There are no glyphs assigned specifically to the consonant [gw] ~ [gb]. The result of these conflations is that the only syllables for which there is no ambiguity (except for tone) are those beginning with the consonant [t].

There is a single punctuation mark, the pipe, which corresponds to a comma or a period. Afaka initially used spaces between words, but not all writers have continued to do so.

Etymology
The origins of many of the letters are obscure, though several appear to be acrophonic rebuses, with many of these being symbols from Africa. Examples of rebuses include a curl with a dot in it representing a baby in the belly (in Ndyuka, a abi beli, lit. "she has belly", means "she's pregnant"), which stands for [be]; two hands outstretched to give (Ndyuka gi) stand for [gi]; iconic symbols for come (Ndyuka kon) and go to represent [ko] or [kon] and [go]; two linked circles for we stand for [wi], while [yu] is an inversion of [mi], corresponding to the pronouns you and me; letters like Roman numerals two and four are [tu] and [fo]. (which would be like writing "2 4get" for 'to forget' in English.) [ka] and [pi] are said to represent feces (Ndyuka kaka) and urine (pisi). A "+" sign stands for [ne] or [nen], from the word name (Ndyuka nen), derived from the practice of signing one's name with an X. The odd conflation of [u] and [ku] is due to the letter being a pair of hooks, which is uku in Ndyuka. The only letters which appear to correspond to the Latin alphabet are the vowels a, o, and maybe e, though o is justified as the shape of the mouth when pronouncing it.

Variants and syllabic order
Texts in Afaka's own hand show significant variation in the letters. A good number are rotated a quarter turn, and sometimes inverted as well; these are 
be, di, dyo, fi, ga, ge, ye, ni, nya, pu, se, so, te, and tu, 
while lo, ba/pa, and wa may be in mirror-image and sa, to may be simply inverted.
Others have curved vs angular variants: do, fa, ge, go, ko, and kwa. In yet others, the variants appear to reflect differences in stroke order.

The traditional mnemonic order (alphabetic order) may partially reflect the origins of some of the signs. For example, tu and fo ("two" and "four", respectively), yu and mi ("you" and "me"), and ko and go ("come" and "go") are placed near each other. Other syllables are placed near each other to spell out words: futu ("foot"), odi ("hello"), and ati ("heart"), or even phrases: a moke un taki ("it gives us speech"), masa gado te baka ben ye ("Lord God, that the white/black(?) man heard").

Computer encoding

The Afaka script has been proposed for inclusion in the Unicode Standard.  The codepoints U+16C80 through U+16CCF have been tentatively designated for the script.

Sample text
This is apparently the first letter written by Afaka. It was copied into the Patili Molosi Buku c. 1917.

Notes

References
Dubelaar, Cornelis & André Pakosie, Het Afakaschrift van de Tapanahoni rivier in Suriname. Utrecht 1999. .
Gonggryp, J. W. 1960. The Evolution of a Djuka-Script in Surinam. Nieuwe West-Indische Gids 40:63-72.
Huttar, George. 1987. The Afaka script: an indigenous creole syllabary. In The Thirteenth LACUS Forum, pp. 167–177.
Huttar, George. 1992. Afaka and his creole syllabary: the social context of a writing system. Language in Context: essays for Robert E. Longacre, ed. by Shin Ja Hwang and William Merrifield, pp. 593–604. Dallas: SIL and University of Texas at Arlington.

External links
A sample of Afaka script on a memorial in Surinam. The phrase is Odun m'sigasiye "I'm prepared to die for freedom", which in Afaka is O.DO.MI.SI.GA.SI.E
The font used at Omniglot. The only available font is poorly designed, apparently copied from a low-resolution image.

Syllabary writing systems
Ndyuka language
Constructed scripts
Writing systems of the Americas
Writing systems introduced in 1910
English-based pidgins and creoles
African-based pidgins and creoles